Ponte de Varziela is a bridge in Portugal. It is located in Castro Laboreiro, Viana do Castelo District.

See also
List of bridges in Portugal

Bridges in Viana do Castelo District
Buildings and structures in Melgaço, Portugal
Properties of Public Interest in Portugal
Castro Laboreiro
Listed bridges in Portugal